"I Told You So" is a song by Ocean Colour Scene (OCS) and the first single to be taken from the band's 2007 album On the Leyline.

The song was released on 16 April 2007 in the UK and on the 13 April in Ireland. It peaked at number 34 on the UK Official Singles Chart in its first week of release. As of 2021, it remains their last UK Top 40 hit.

In the "On The Leyline Promo Trailer" lead singer Simon Fowler says that this is his first pop song he has written in a while and he also said he wrote it for a bit of fun.

For the b sides to CD 1 the band included the song "Jimmy Wonder", which was written by Simon Fowler and originally entitled "It's a Lifetime Sentence Loving You" recalling his experiences of the producer Jimmy Miller. The song was debuted by Simon Fowler during an interview and live session for Johnnie Walkers Drivetime show on BBC Radio 2in March 2006 and has yet to be played by the full band.

Track listing

CD 1
 "I Told You So"
 "Jimmy Wonder"
 "I Just Need Myself" - Caged Baby Remix

CD 2 (ltd. Edition)
 "I Told You So"
 "Right on Time"

7"(blue)
 "I Told You So"
 This side has no music, but has signatures of the band etched into the vinyl.

Acoustic Version Download
A download only  acoustic version of "I Told You So" was released exclusively via the  online music download retailer  Tunetribe.com. However the track is not a pure acoustic track, rather a stripped down version of the album/single track with most electric instruments removed.

References

External links
Announcement of single track listing
OCS performing I Told You So on Irish TV
Announcement of UK Chart Position

Ocean Colour Scene songs
2007 singles
2007 songs
Songs written by Simon Fowler
Songs written by Steve Cradock
Songs written by Oscar Harrison